The 1996–97 season was the 94th season in existence of Cremonese and the club's first season back in the top flight of Italian football. In addition to the domestic league, Cremonese participated in this season's edition of the Coppa Italia. The season covered the period from 1 July 1996 to 30 June 1997. The team was relegated for the second season in a row.

Players

First-team squad

Pre-season and friendlies

Competitions

Overview

Serie B

League table

Results summary

Results by round

Matches

Source:

Coppa Italia

References

U.S. Cremonese seasons
U.S. Cremonese